Thomas L. Hancock (February 3, 1948 – January 31, 2016) was an American politician who was Iowa State Senator from the 16th District. A Democrat, he served in the Iowa Senate from 2005.  He retired from the United States Postal Service after 31 years and was a member of the Epworth Volunteer Fire Department.

Hancock served on several committees in the Iowa Senate: the Agriculture committee; the Appropriations committee; the Environment and Energy Independence committee; the Judiciary committee; the Transportation committee; and the Natural Resources committee, where he was vice chair.  He also served as chair of the Justice System Appropriations Subcommittee.

Hancock was last re-elected in 2008 with 17,129 votes, defeating Republican opponent Dave McLaughlin. He died of an apparent heart attack on January 31, 2016, in Dubuque.

References

External links
 Senator Tom Hancockofficial Iowa Legislature site
 Senator Tom Hancockofficial Iowa General Assembly site
State Senator Tom Hancockofficial constituency site
 

1948 births
2016 deaths
Democratic Party Iowa state senators
United States Postal Service people
People from Epworth, Iowa